Emmanuel Touaboy is a diplomat from the Central African Republic. Touaboy was appointed to the position of Ambassador to the United States in February 2001 by President Ange-Félix Patassé. When Patassé was overthrown by rebel leader François Bozizé, Touaboy maintained his post in the United States. He was succeeded by Stanislas Moussa-Kembe in 2009.

References

20th-century births
Living people
Year of birth missing (living people)
Ambassadors of the Central African Republic to the United States